The 2000–01 Belarusian Extraliga season was the ninth season of the Belarusian Extraliga, the top level of ice hockey in Belarus. Seven teams participated in the league, and HK Neman Grodno won the championship.

Standings

External links 
 Season on hockeyarchives.info

Belarusian Extraleague
Belarusian Extraleague seasons
Extra
2001 in Belarusian sport